Freedberg is a surname. Notable people with the surname include: 

 David Freedberg, art historian
 Irwin Freedberg ( 1933–2005), American professor of dermatology
 Sydney Joseph Freedberg (1914–1997), American art historian